The 1903 South Antrim by-election was held after the sitting Unionist MP William Ellison-Macartney had left the Commons to take up the post of  Deputy-Master of the Royal Mint. The Unionists nominated Charles Craig, a first time candidate who defeated a Russellite opponent to win the seat.

Craig held the seat through four subsequent general elections.

References

External links 
A Vision Of Britain Through Time (Constituency elector numbers)

1903 elections in Ireland
1903 elections in the United Kingdom
By-elections to the Parliament of the United Kingdom in County Antrim constituencies
20th century in County Antrim